Bedstone is a small village and civil parish in south Shropshire, England, close to the border with Herefordshire.

Bedstone College
Bedstone College, an independent boarding and day school founded in 1948, was purchased in 2017 by London & Oxford Group, an asset management and investment banking firm specialising in introduction of Chinese investment to the UK Education sector. LOG has reportedly made little or no governance changes to the school and "giving its full support to the current management team at Bedstone."  Famous former pupils include the present Astronomer Royal, Sir Martin Rees (whose parents founded the school), now Baron Rees of Ludlow, and explorer and TV presenter Monty Halls. The current head is Toby Mullins.

Educating around 220 day and boarding students, the College is not selective and does not require pupils to sit an entrance exam. It offers a broad curriculum from reception through to A Level. Physical education and extra-curricular activities are an integral part of the school week, which includes Saturday-morning lessons and five afternoons set aside for sports and a choice of activities.

There are four boarding houses:
 Bedstone House - for junior girls
 Wilson House - for senior girls
 Rutter House - for junior boys
 Pearson House - for senior boys
Each is run by houseparents who are typically academic staff and their families.

Its campus houses the notable country house that is Bedstone Court. Its founders include the parents of Sir Martin Rees.  On GCSE results, the College is the second best non-selective school in Shropshire and the sixth overall.

Norman Origin
St Mary's church dates back to Norman times and features an original Norman font, a timber framed bellcote and a shingled spire, and some of the houses, which include several thatched cottages, are more than 600 years old.

Buildings

Manor Farm house is an example of a timber-framed house and was partly stone-faced in 1775. Bedstone Court, now the home of Bedstone College, is a more flamboyant black-and-white mansion, built between 1882 and 1884, designed by Thomas Harris for Henry Ripley, MP and is a calendar house reputed to have 365 windows, 52 rooms (on the first two floors) twelve chimneys and seven external doors. The central hall has a magnificent 52-panelled stained-glass window depicting the months of the year, signs of the zodiac, birds associated with the month and the agricultural activity of the month.

The building was heavily damaged by a fire in 1996 but was fully restored and continues to be the centrepiece of Bedstone College: the independent co-educational boarding and day school for pupils from 4 to 18.

Amenities
Until the 2000s there was a post office but now there is just a Royal Mail post box in the hamlet.

Parish
The civil parish covers a small area, with no other settlements than Bedstone itself. With a parish population of just 85 (in 2001), the parish council has now been merged with that of neighbouring Bucknell parish. In ecclesiastical terms, the church is linked with those of Hopton Castle and Clungunford.

See also
Listed buildings in Bedstone

References

External links

 Village website also includes nearby Bucknell
 Bedstone College official website
 Bedstone Educational Limited, new owners of College, at Companies House. Retrieved 27 February 2018
 Schools in Shropshire. BBC News, 11 January 2007. Retrieved 27 February 2018

Villages in Shropshire
Civil parishes in Shropshire